The Osage Fork Gasconade River is a stream in Wright, Webster and Laclede counties in the Ozarks of southern Missouri. It is a tributary of the  Gasconade River.

The stream headwaters arise in Webster County near the intersection of Missouri routes C and P about seven miles north of Seymour. The stream flows north past High Prairie where it turns to the northwest. It flows under Missouri Route 38 about five miles east of Marshfield and turns to the northeast as it passes under Missouri Route DD. It passes about 3.5 miles east of Niangua and continues to the northeast passing under Missouri Route ZZ just west of Rader to enter Laclede County. It meanders to the southeast and crosses into the northwest corner of Wright County before returning to a northeast direction back into Laclede County adjacent to the community of Pease. It meanders on northeast passing under Missouri Route 5 and then Missouri Route 32 south of Drynob. It meanders north and enters the Gasconade about one mile south of I-44 and 1.5 miles west of the Laclede-Pulaski county line.

References

Rivers of Laclede County, Missouri
Rivers of Webster County, Missouri
Rivers of Wright County, Missouri
Rivers of Missouri
Tributaries of the Gasconade River